Bangor is a census-designated place in Butte County, California, about  from the Yuba County line. The community is in a shallow valley with surrounding hills in the 800–950 foot range. The population was 646 at the 2010 census.

Bangor was founded as a mining boom-town in 1855 and named by the Lumbert Brothers, early settlers and storekeepers, for their home-town of Bangor, Maine. The first post office was established in 1857.

Oroville-Bangor Highway becomes Los Verjeles Road south of town, these roads running roughly north–south. LaPorte Road runs somewhat east–west through the community. There are two restaurants listed in the telephone directory. Bangor is in area code 530 and has a ZIP Code of 95914. Driving east on LaPorte Road into the mountains eventually leads to Camp Eighteen.

Demographics

The 2010 United States Census reported that Bangor had a population of 646. The racial makeup of Bangor was 543 (84.1%) White, 5 (0.8%) African American, 17 (2.6%) Native American, 4 (0.6%) Asian, 1 (0.2%) Pacific Islander, 18 (2.8%) from other races, and 58 (9.0%) from two or more races. Hispanic or Latino of any race were 47 persons (7.3%).

The Census reported that 646 people (100% of the population) lived in households, 0 (0%) lived in non-institutionalized group quarters, and 0 (0%) were institutionalized.

There were 234 households, out of which 73 (31.2%) had children under the age of 18 living in them, 136 (58.1%) were opposite-sex married couples living together, 24 (10.3%) had a female householder with no husband present, 16 (6.8%) had a male householder with no wife present.  There were 10 (4.3%) unmarried opposite-sex partnerships, and 4 (1.7%) same-sex married couples or partnerships. 50 households (21.4%) were made up of individuals, and 17 (7.3%) had someone living alone who was 65 years of age or older. The average household size was 2.76.  There were 176 families (75.2% of all households); the average family size was 3.14.

The population was spread out, with 169 people (26.2%) under the age of 18, 40 people (6.2%) aged 18 to 24, 104 people (16.1%) aged 25 to 44, 216 people (33.4%) aged 45 to 64, and 117 people (18.1%) who were 65 years of age or older.  The median age was 46.9 years. For every 100 females, there were 92.3 males.  For every 100 females age 18 and over, there were 95.5 males.

There were 280 housing units at an average density of 20.9 per square mile (8.1/km), of which 234 were occupied, of which 185 (79.1%) were owner-occupied, and 49 (20.9%) were occupied by renters. The homeowner vacancy rate was 2.6%; the rental vacancy rate was 3.8%.  498 people (77.1% of the population) lived in owner-occupied housing units and 148 people (22.9%) lived in rental housing units.

Bangor has a growing wine industry.  Hickman Family Vineyards was the first, opening in 2011, followed by Bangor Ranch Vineyard & Winery in 2012.  There are currently three other winery start-ups pending. This is due to the area's soils, climate, and location.  Bangor is located in the center of the North Sierra Wine Trail, which encompasses the East Foothills of Lake Oroville, through Bangor, and on to the micro appellation of North Yuba.  The Trail is at the extreme northern tip of the Sierra Foothill Appellation. In 2010 the Mennonite-owned Bangor Bake Shoppe opened, specializing in home style baking, jams, quilts, and more.

Bangor Ghost 

In early 2009, firefighters began reporting ghost sightings inside Butte County Fire Station 55. According to legend it would pin down firefighters in their beds, pull the ignition cords from the fire engine, and perform other mischievous acts. Its most notable trait was the loud wailing screech it emitted. The sightings around the station stopped in 2011 when the fire station was demolished and replaced. According to local legend, replacing the station only released the spirit, which now haunts the local hills.

References

External links
June 1998 plane crash near Bangor.
See a weather station in Bangor.
Firefighters Convinced Mischievous Phantom Haunts Station

Census-designated places in Butte County, California
Populated places established in 1855
Census-designated places in California
1855 establishments in California